The Little Androscoggin River is a  river in Maine. It flows from Bryant Pond in Woodstock to its confluence with the Androscoggin River in Auburn. The Androscoggin flows into Merrymeeting Bay in the Kennebec River estuary.

The Little Androscoggin flows through the towns of Woodstock, Greenwood, West Paris, Paris (including the village of South Paris), Norway, Oxford, Mechanic Falls, Minot, and Poland, and the city of Auburn.

Thompson Lake

Thompson Lake is the largest lake in the Little Androscoggin watershed. The north end of the lake overflows into the Little Androscoggin River through the village of Oxford. The lake forms the boundary between Otisfield to the west and Oxford and Poland to the northeast and southeast, respectively. The southern tip of the lake is in Casco. Greeley Brook is the largest tributary to the lake, and flows  from Sand Pond in Norway. Smaller tributaries include Knights Brook and Jerry Brook in Otisfield and Potash Brook in Poland. The lake is good habitat for smallmouth and largemouth bass and has been stocked with trout.

See also
List of rivers of Maine

References

Maine Streamflow Data from the USGS
Maine Watershed Data From Environmental Protection Agency

Tributaries of the Kennebec River
Rivers of Androscoggin County, Maine
Rivers of Oxford County, Maine
Mechanic Falls, Maine
Auburn, Maine
Norway, Maine
Oxford, Maine
Rivers of Maine